Krzczonów may refer to the following places in Poland:
Krzczonów, Lower Silesian Voivodeship (south-west Poland)
Krzczonów Landscape Park, a protected area in eastern Poland
Krzczonów, Lublin Voivodeship (east Poland)
Krzczonów, Łódź Voivodeship (central Poland)
Krzczonów, Świętokrzyskie Voivodeship (south-central Poland)
Krzczonów, Lesser Poland Voivodeship (south Poland)